Riediger is a German surname. Notable people with the surname include:

Hans-Jürgen Riediger (born 1955), East German footballer
Karin Riediger (born 1961), German figure skater

German-language surnames